Citranaxanthin is a carotenoid pigment used as a food additive under the E number E161i as a food coloring. There are natural sources of citranaxanthin, but it is generally prepared synthetically.  It is used as an animal feed additive to impart a yellow color to chicken fat and egg yolks.

References

Carotenoids
Food colorings
Cyclohexenes